William Weston J. Newton (born February 22, 1967) is an American politician. He is a member of the South Carolina House of Representatives from the 120th District, serving since 2013. He is a member of the Republican party. He was the chairman of the oversight committee and served on the judiciary committee.

In 2022, Newton was appointed Chair of the House Judiciary Committee.

References

Living people
1967 births
Republican Party members of the South Carolina House of Representatives
21st-century American politicians